The Campania class was a pair of small protected cruisers built for the Italian Regia Marina (Royal Navy) in the 1910s. The Campania class was designed for use in Italy's overseas colonies, on the model of the old . Neither ship had a particularly eventful career. Basilicata was destroyed by a boiler explosion in 1919, two years after entering service, and was subsequently raised and scrapped. Campania remained in service for significantly longer, but she did not see action and ended her career as a training ship before being scrapped in 1937.

Design
The ships of the Campania class were designed for use in Italy's overseas colonies and to serve as training ships for naval cadets. The design was based on the old cruiser , which had also been built as a colonial cruiser. The ships were fitted with a pair of pole masts equipped with spotting tops. They had a crew of 11 officers and 193 enlisted men, and were also capable of carrying 100 cadets, along with their officers, petty officers, staff, and equipment.

Their propulsion system consisted of a pair of vertical triple-expansion steam engines each driving a single screw propeller, with steam supplied by four coal-fired, cylindrical fire-tube boilers. The boilers were trunked into a single funnel amidships.

Campania and Basilicata were armed with a main battery of six  40-caliber (cal.) guns mounted singly; one was placed on the forecastle, one at the stern, and two on each broadside in sponsons on the main deck. They also carried several small guns, including two  guns manufactured by Vickers and a pair of machine guns.

Ships
Campania and Basilicata were small enough that they could be built on the same slipway, and they were launched on the same day. They were the last protected cruisers to be built by the Regia Marina. This was partly a result of the outbreak of World War I during the construction of these ships, and the resulting shortage of steel as resources were dedicated to the construction of smaller scouts, destroyers, and submarines, which proved to be more useful in the confined waters of the Adriatic Sea. After the war, Italy received several light cruisers as war prizes from Germany and Austria-Hungary, and these ships formed the backbone of the Italian reconnaissance force in the immediate post-war period.

Service history
Both ships served abroad in the first few years of their active service in Italian Libya, and had uneventful careers. Basilicatas career was cut short on 13 August 1919, when one of her boilers exploded while she was moored in Tewfik at the southern end of the Suez Canal. The explosion sank the ship; she was raised in September 1920 but was deemed not worth repairing, and so she was sold for scrap in July 1921. Campania was reclassified as a gunboat that year and had two of her 152 mm guns removed. She became a full-time training ship in 1932, a role in which she served until March 1937, when she was stricken from the naval register and sold for scrap.

Notes

References

External links
 Campania Marina Militare website